Volodymyr (Vladimir) Titarenko (born 4 May 1978) is a Ukrainian volleyball player and member of Ukraine men's national volleyball team in 2001–2009.

Career 
Volodymyr Titarenko started his career in the Ukrainian Volleyball Superleague in 1996. He played for VC Dynamo Luhansk for four seasons. With this team he became Vice-champion of Ukraine.

The next season (1999-2000) Titarenko played for Dorozhnyk-SKA Odessa and had Vice-champion status for the second time.

In 2000 he signed a contract with VC Lokomotyv Kharkiv. In 2004 he won the CEV Top Teams Cup.

In Spain Volodymyr Titarenko was playing in Superliga for Portol Son Amar Palma for two years. At that time he won the Superliga, Supercopa, Copa del Rey and became Vice-champion of CEV Top Teams Cup.

After playing in the Spanish league he returned to Lokomotyv Kharkiv and won Ukrainian Volleyball Cup in season 2007-08

Titarenko has been playing in Russian Volleyball Super League: VC Dynamo Moscow and VC Tyumen since 2008. In 2009 he was selected to theAll-Star Team of Russian Volleyball Super League. He continued his career as a professional volleyball player until 2013.

Volodymyr Titarenko currently lives in Texas, USA and works as a volleyball coach.

National team  
He debuted with the Ukraine men's national volleyball team in 2001. He was a participant of the European Volleyball Championship 2005.

With Ukraine national under-19 team Volodymyr Titarenko participated in:
 1995 — Youth European Volleyball Championship (Qualification)
 1996 — Youth European Volleyball Championship (5th place)

With Ukraine national under-21 team Volodymyr Titarenko participated in:
 1997 — Junior European Volleyball Championship (Qualification)
 1998 — Junior European Volleyball Championship (11th place)

With Ukraine national volleyball team Volodymyr Titarenko participated:
 2001 — European Volleyball Championship (Qualification)
 2003 — European Volleyball Championship (Qualification)
 2004 — Olympic volleyball tournament (Qualification)
 2005 — European Volleyball Championship (Qualification)
 2005 — European Volleyball Championship (12th place)
 2006 — FIVB Volleyball Men's World Championship (Qualification)
 2009 — European Volleyball Championship (Qualification)

Honours and achievements

Club
VC Dynamo Luhansk
  Ukrainian Volleyball Super League runner-up: 1995-96

Dorozhnyk-SKA Odessa
  Ukrainian Volleyball Super League runner-up: 1999-00

Lokomotyv Kharkiv
  Ukrainian Volleyball Super League: 2000–01, 2001–02, 2002–03, 2003–04, 2004–05
  Ukrainian Volleyball Cup: 2002, 2003, 2004, 2008
  European Championship: 2003-04

Portol Son Amar Palma
  Superliga de Voleibol Masculina: 2005–06, 2006–07
  Copa del Rey de Voleibol: 2005–06, 2006–07
  Supercopa de España de Voleibol: 2005-06
  European Championship runner-up: 2005-06

VC Dynamo Moscow
   Russian Volleyball Cup: 2008

Individual 
 Ukrainian Volleyball Super League Best Blocker: 2003-04
 Superliga de Voleibol Masculina Best Blocker: 2005-06
 Honored badge of merit of Kharkiv Regional Council "Slobozhanskaya Glory": 2004
 Badge of honour "Railway glory" third degree: 2004

References

External links
 Volley.ru profile
 Worldofvolley.com profile
 CEV profile
 Sportbox profile

1978 births
Living people
Ukrainian men's volleyball players
VC Lokomotyv Kharkiv players
People from Alchevsk
Sportspeople from Luhansk Oblast